Advisory Committee is Mirah's second full-length album. It was released on K Records on March 19, 2002, and produced by both Mirah and Phil Elvrum.

Production
Advisory Committee was recorded over a one-year period, starting on September 17, 2000 and ending on July 4, 2001. It was produced by both Mirah and Phil Elvrum, and was released on K Records on March 19, 2002.

Reception

The album was well-received, earning an AllMusic score of 4.5/5, and a Pitchfork Media score of 8.3/10, who praised the maturity of her voice and lyrics.

Track listing
"Cold Cold Water" – 5:09
"After You Left" – 1:38
"Make It Hot" – 2:30
"Mt. St. Helens" – 4:08
"Recommendation" – 1:20
"Body Below" – 4:08
"The Sun" – 3:14
"Advisory Committee" – 2:57
"Special Death" – 2:32
"The Garden" – 2:21
"Light the Match" – 3:00
"Apples in the Trees" – 2:01
"Monument" – 2:51
"Untitled" – 1:31

Personnel
Mirah - Bass Pedals, Bells, Composer, Drums (Steel), Engineer, Guitar, Layout Design, Machines, Mixing, Organ, Percussion, Piano, Primary Artist, Pump Organ, Vocals, Xylophone
Phil Elvrum - Engineer, Mixing
Chris Adolph -	Bass Pedals, Engineer, Melodica, Moog Synthesizer, Musical Saw, Xylophone
Mark Greer -  Mastering
Ed Varga - Mixing
Bobby Burg - Engineer, Loop, Percussion
Nora Danielson - Strings, Violin
Aaron Hartman - String Bass
Khaela Maricich - Choir/Chorus, Guitar
Ariana Murray - Choir/Chorus
Bryce Panic - Bass Pedals, Drums, Percussion, Vocals
Kory Ross - Drums
Tae Won Yu - Photography

References

External links
MirahMusic.com

2002 albums
Mirah albums
K Records albums